Anthony Joseph Hellman  (May 29, 1861 – March 19, 1898), was a Major League Baseball player who played catcher. He played for the  Baltimore Orioles of the American Association in one game on October 10, 1886. He was hitless in three at-bats in that game. He played in the minor leagues through 1889.

External links

1861 births
1898 deaths
Major League Baseball catchers
Baltimore Orioles (AA) players
19th-century baseball players
Dayton Gem Citys players
Terre Haute (minor league baseball) players
Nashville Americans players
Birmingham Maroons players
Columbus Senators players
Sioux City Corn Huskers players
Baseball players from Ohio